Jeopardy! is an American television quiz show created by Merv Griffin, in which contestants are presented with clues in the form of answers and must phrase their responses in the form of questions. Over the years, the show has featured many tournaments and special events.

Regular tournaments and events

Tournament of Champions
Jeopardy! has conducted a regular tournament called the "Tournament of Champions", featuring the most successful champions and other big winners who have appeared on the show since the last tournament. It was held every year during Art Fleming's hosting run and has been held roughly once a year, with some exceptions, since 1984.

The current series’ Tournament of Champions lasts two weeks over ten episodes in a format devised by then-host and producer Alex Trebek in 1985. The field consists of fifteen former champions, with automatic bids given to winners of any College Championships or Teachers Tournaments held since the previous Tournament of Champions. Since the 2004 tournament, the rest of the field has been set depending on how many games a champion was able to win during their reign, with a contestant needing to win at least three wins to be considered (up to shows taped on October 29, 2020, the last tape day with Alex Trebek hosting; Sony ended the Tournament of Champions cycle after Trebek's death ten days later)—later changed to four wins (effective with the new cycle that began with shows taped November 30, 2020, when production resumed with Ken Jennings as the first interim host). Total winnings are also used if there are multiple champions with the same number of victories. The qualifying rules were changed after the show allowed contestants to continue playing until they were defeated during the twentieth season; prior to that, any champion who won a total of five games retired undefeated and automatically earned a slot in the Tournament of Champions.

The first week consists of five quarterfinal matches featuring three different champions each day. The winners of those five games, plus the four highest-scoring non-winners in the tournament (known as wild cards), advance to the semifinals, where the three winners of the three semifinal matches advance to the finals and compete for the championship in a two-game final match. Each game in this match is scored separately from the other; if a finalist ends the Double Jeopardy! round with a zero or negative total, their score for that day is recorded as zero. The combined totals from both games are used to determine the overall standings.

The top prize for the Tournament of Champions on the current series was initially $100,000. Beginning with the 2003 Tournament of Champions, which was the first held after the clue values were doubled in 2001, the prize was increased to $250,000. After the initial tournament, where they were guaranteed to receive their cumulative total in cash, each runner-up has been guaranteed a minimum dollar amount depending on their placing. The current figures were established in 2006, with a minimum of $100,000 for second place and $50,000 for third. Players eliminated before the finals win a fixed award of $5,000 for quarterfinalists or $10,000 for semifinalists.

On the Fleming-era tournaments, all players kept their scores in cash at the end of each game, and in addition to their game winnings, the Grand Champions also won a tropical vacation and were presented with a trophy called the Griffin Award, named for Merv Griffin.

The Season 37 tournament, which was when the show used various interim hosts, was hosted by Austin "Buzzy" Cohen, who won the Season 34 tournament.

The Season 39 tournament featured a new format which provided an expanded field of 21 contestants. The top three seeded contestants qualified for the semifinal rounds; the remaining 18 contestants played six quarterfinal games, with no wild-cards. The six winners advanced to the semifinals and joined the top three seeds. On November 8, 2022, a warm up game for the automatic semifinalists was played, with no prize money at stake. The winners of the semifinal matches advanced to the finals, which consisted of a minimum of three and a maximum of seven games, similar to the Greatest of All Time tournament (see below). The first finalist to win three games won the tournament and the $250,000 top prize. The second-place and third-place prizes were determined first by number of wins, then by number of second-place finishes, and finally by total score across all games played, and won win $100,000 and $50,000, respectively.

Other regular tournaments

Teen Tournament
The Jeopardy! Teen Tournament, which began in 1987, was an annual tournament in which 15 high school students between the ages of 13 and 17 competed in a ten-episode tournament structured similarly to the Tournament of Champions. The winner receives $100,000.

Originally the winner of the Teen Tournament was awarded one of the automatic qualifying spots in the Tournament of Champions that followed their victory. Jeopardy! discontinued this practice after the 2000 Tournament of Champions, with Fall 1999 champion Chacko George being the final Teen Tournament winner to receive the berth; however, each subsequent Teen Tournament winner from 2001 through 2005 was invited to compete in 2005’s Ultimate Tournament of Champions. 

Additionally, Teen Tournament winners have also received merchandise at various points: the winners of the Fall 1999, 2001, 2002, and 2003 Teen Tournaments were awarded new cars, and the 2005 Teen Tournament winner received a computer package. At least one similar tournament was held in May 1967 during Fleming's run, with the winner (out of nine high school seniors who competed) receiving a $10,000 scholarship. The tournament was last held in Season 35.

Teachers Tournament
In May 2011, to mark its 6,000th Trebek-era episode, Jeopardy! introduced its Teachers Tournament featuring 15 full-time teachers of students in kindergarten through grade 12. The tournament is similar in format to other tournaments, with the winner receiving a guaranteed minimum of $100,000 and an invitation to participate in the Tournament of Champions. Second place wins $50,000 and third place wins $25,000 (again if their scores are higher, they win what they score), and players eliminated in the semifinals winning $10,000 and first round losers winning $5,000.

The tournament was not held in Season 37 (2020–21) because of pandemic restrictions, and in Season 38 (2021–22) was billed as the Professors Tournament, for collegiate professors. Mayim Bialik hosted the tournament in Season 38.

 College Championship 
Introduced in 1989, the Jeopardy! College Championship featured 15 full-time undergraduate college students, with the format being similar to the other tournaments. The winner receives $100,000 and an automatic invitation to compete in the Tournament of Champions.

From 1997 until 2008, the College Championship was taped on various college campuses; an exception was the 2000-A College Championship as it was taped in Culver City.

The last syndicated College Championship was held in Season 36 (2019-20). It was not held in Season 37 (2020-21) due to travel restrictions amid the COVID-19 pandemic. And beginning in 2022, it was reformatted and moved to primetime, billed as the National College Championship.

Second Chance Tournament
On October 17, 2022, Jeopardy! launched a Second Chance Tournament, featuring contestants who had high scores during a previous appearance but failed to win their games.

Eighteen contestants participated in the tournament, which spanned two consecutive weeks and 10 episodes. Each week was a separate competition, with three new contestants playing per day on Monday through Wednesday. The winners of these games advanced to a two-game match played on Thursday and Friday under the same scoring rules as in other tournaments, and the winner of this match received a slot in the Tournament of Champions.

Cash awards were as follows:

 Standard cash awards in semifinals
 Third place, finals: $10,000
 Second place, finals: $20,000
 Winner, finals: $35,000 and Tournament of Champions

Unlike other tournaments, even if the scores exceeded the minimum guarantees, finalists were only awarded the aforementioned cash prizes.

Celebrity Jeopardy! and variantsCelebrity Jeopardy!, whose inaugural episode aired on October 26, 1992, features notable individuals as contestants competing for charitable organizations of their choice (or, in the cases of public officials, relevant charities chosen by the Jeopardy! production staff). The tradition of special Jeopardy! matches featuring celebrity contestants goes back to the original NBC series, which featured appearances by such notables as Rod Serling, Bill Cullen, Art James, and Peter Marshall. On the Trebek version, Celebrity Jeopardy! traditionally had been broadcast annually as a weeklong event in the 1990s before becoming increasingly sparse and irregular in the 2000s and 2010s. Unlike the regular games in which a player finishing the Double Jeopardy! round with a zero or negative score is disqualified from playing the Final Jeopardy! round, Celebrity Jeopardy! instead grants players a nominal score of $1,000 with which to wager for the final round. Since its debut, Celebrity Jeopardy! has featured over 200 celebrity contestants. The most recent syndicated episodes under the title Celebrity Jeopardy! aired in May 2015; the title was later revived for an ABC network version as discussed below.

Million Dollar Celebrity Invitational 
The Million Dollar Celebrity Invitational began on September 17, 2009, and subsequent games aired on the third Thursday of every month from September 2009 to April 2010, with an additional quarter-final on the third Friday of April 2010. The semi-final and final rounds aired during the first full week of May 2010. A total of 27 celebrities—three per game for the nine semifinal episodes—competed for a grand prize of $1,000,000 for their charity. The winners of each qualifying game returned in May 2010 for three semi-final games. However, Andy Richter, who won his quarterfinal game, was unable to make semifinal taping due to scheduling conflicts. Isaac Mizrahi replaced Richter as a wild card, using standard wild card rules. The semi-final winners competed in a two-day total point final to determine the grand champion in a format similar to other annual Jeopardy! tournaments. The winner of each qualifying game won a minimum of $50,000 for their charity (more if their post-Final Jeopardy! score exceeded $50,000), and the two runners-up each received $25,000 for their charities. Jane Curtin, Michael McKean, and Cheech Marin advanced to the two-game final, and McKean won the tournament, earning $1 million for his charity, the International Myeloma Foundation.

Power Players Week 
Power Players Week began on November 17, 1997, and features personalities in journalism and politics. And because of this, episodes are always taped at DAR Constitution Hall. After the inaugural event, the next three Power Players Weeks were aired in May 2004 (Season 20); May 2012 (Season 28); and most recently, May 2016 (Season 32).

2022 primetime tournament 

In May 2022, ABC announced a one-hour network prime time version of Celebrity Jeopardy! to air Sunday nights beginning fall 2022, with the premiere date subsequently scheduled for September 25. Executive producer Michael Davies then confirmed in July that Mayim Bialik would host the primetime series. Rather than airing two games in a one-hour timeslot as with previous primetime versions, each edition features a single hour-long game, with two main changes: first, the Jeopardy! round uses $100 to $500 values and the Double Jeopardy! round uses $200 to $1,000 values (last used in 2001); second, a Triple Jeopardy! round is added, featuring tripled clue values ranging from $300 to $1,500 and three hidden Daily Double clues. The season had 27 players competing in a 13-week tournament with nine quarterfinals, three semifinals, and one final. The winner receives $1,000,000 for their charity.

Saturday Night Live parodies 
Celebrity Jeopardy! has repeatedly been parodied in a recurring sketch on Saturday Night Live, with Will Ferrell acting as Alex Trebek (with the real Alex Trebek making a cameo appearance in Ferrell's final sketch as a regular cast member). Comic foils to Alex Trebek (Ferrell) included Norm Macdonald as Burt Reynolds and Darrell Hammond as Sean Connery. Other parodies have been produced, including "Black Jeopardy!".

Other recurring events

When season 16 began in September 1999, the show inaugurated Kids Week, a week of five special non-tournament games featuring children aged 10 to 12. Three new contestants compete each day. The winners of each game keep whatever they win, with minimum guarantees of $15,000. The second- and third-place contestants receive consolation prizes of $2,000 and $1,000, respectively. The first four times the event was held, the player who had the highest winning score during the week was also awarded a bonus of $5,000. The last Kids Week episodes aired in 2014.

Special events

ABC tournaments
Four Jeopardy! events have been scheduled outside the show's usual syndication run, all on ABC: Super Jeopardy! aired in 1990, the Greatest of All Time aired in 2020, the National College Championship aired in February 2022, and the aforementioned Celebrity Jeopardy! primetime tournament began airing in September 2022. The ABC Owned Television Stations group has been the lead broadcaster of the syndicated version for most of its run.

Super Jeopardy!
Super Jeopardy! was a special summer series that premiered on June 16, 1990 on ABC. It was the first attempt during Alex Trebek's hosting run to gather the series' best contestants up to that date.

A total of thirty-six contestants competed in Super Jeopardy!. Thirty-five of them were some of the biggest winners that had competed in the first six years of the syndicated Jeopardy! series that had aired to that point. The other spot was reserved for Burns Cameron, who had appeared on the original daytime series in 1965 and won a total of $11,110 in regular and tournament play to set that series' all-time record.

Super Jeopardy! featured four contestants per episode in the quarterfinal games, while subsequent rounds were played with the usual three players. Each game was played for points instead of money, and the clue values were adjusted accordingly; correct responses were worth 200–1000 points in the Jeopardy! round and 500–2500 points in Double Jeopardy!; this was the only time in the show's history that the second round values were not double those of the first round.

Any contestant eliminated in the quarterfinal round won $5,000 and the contestants eliminated in the semifinal round won $10,000.

The finals of the tournament aired on September 8, 1990, and pitted 1987 Tournament of Champions winner Bob Verini and finalist Dave Traini against 1988 Tournament of Champions quarterfinalist and four-day champion Bruce Seymour in a one-day final match where the winner received $250,000. Traini finished in negative territory and could not play Final Jeopardy!, which meant he automatically finished third and won $25,000. Seymour, leading entering Final Jeopardy!, correctly answered the final clue and won the top prize. Verini, who did not answer correctly, finished second and won $50,000.

The Greatest of All Time

Announced on November 18, 2019 and aired beginning January 7, 2020, the tournament featured contestants Ken Jennings, Brad Rutter, and James Holzhauer competing in a tournament with a top prize of $1 million. The tournament was structured as first-to-three-wins format over a series of one-hour episodes, with each episode a stand-alone match consisting of two back-to-back complete Jeopardy! games, using points instead of dollars. Ken Jennings won the tournament in four matches, with James Holzhauer winning one match and Brad Rutter winning none. As the tournament winner, Jennings was named "The Greatest of All Time", won the $1 million prize, and reclaimed the top spot for most money won on a game show. The two non-winners received $250,000 each.

National College Championship 

The Jeopardy! National College Championship premiered on ABC on February 8, 2022. Unlike Super Jeopardy! and The Greatest of All Time, this tournament is an annual event. There are a few differences from the previous syndicated tournament: The format was changed to expand the pool to 36 contestants, and there are twelve quarterfinal matches and four semifinals, with no wild cards. The semifinalist who finishes in fourth place receives $35,000 and an automatic invitation into the Second Chance Tournament. The winner takes home $250,000 and an automatic spot in the Tournament of Champions, while the runners-up receive $100,000 and $50,000 for second and third place, respectively. Eliminated semifinalists receive $10,000 while eliminated quarterfinalists receive $5,000.

Other all-time best tournaments

10th Anniversary Tournament
From November 29, 1993 to December 3, 1993, Jeopardy! held a special one-week 10th Anniversary Tournament to honor the Trebek version's 10th season, which featured one Tournament of Champions-qualified contestant from each of the nine completed seasons to that point. Eight contestants were drawn at random and were revealed over the course of four episodes. After Tom Nosek won the 1993 Tournament of Champions, he received the ninth position. 

Contestants competed for a winner's prize of a combined two-day final score total plus a $25,000 bonus. The event resembled the show's regular tournaments sans a quarterfinal round, with three semifinal matches to determine three finalists, who then competed against each other in a two-game total point match. Eliminated semifinalists received consolation prizes of $5,000, while the second runner-up received a guaranteed minimum of $7,500, the first runner-up received a guaranteed minimum of $10,000, and the winner earned his or her two-game total plus a $25,000 bonus. Frank Spangenberg won the tournament with a two-game score of $16,800 plus a $25,000 bonus for a total of $41,800. Tom Nosek finished second with $13,600, while Leslie Frates won the $7,500 guaranteed third place prize, which exceeded her score of $4,499.

Million Dollar Masters 
In May 2002, to commemorate the Trebek version's 4,000th episode, Jeopardy! invited fifteen former champions to participate in a special tournament called the Million Dollar Masters, with a guaranteed seven-figure payday for the winner. The tournament was held at Radio City Music Hall in New York City and featured the same two-week, three-round format as the traditional tournaments on Jeopardy! The event's first round ran from May 1 to May 7, and the three semifinal matches aired from May 8–10. The three finalists were Eric Newhouse, who won the 1989 Teen Tournament and the special 1998 Teen Reunion Tournament; Brad Rutter, a five-time champion from 2000 who won the Tournament of Champions held earlier in the 2001–02 season; and Bob Verini, the winner of the 1987 Tournament of Champions and the runner-up in the 1990 Super Jeopardy! tournament. The tournament ended with Rutter winning the $1,000,000 grand prize, Newhouse coming in second and winning $100,000, and Verini placing third and winning $50,000.

Ultimate Tournament of Champions
The Ultimate Tournament of Champions, a special 15-week single-elimination tournament involving a total of 145 contestants, began airing on February 9, 2005 and concluded on May 25, 2005, covering 76 shows in total. Ken Jennings, who had just completed his record-setting run as champion three months before the tournament started, was invited to compete in the tournament; he was automatically awarded a spot in the final match. The other 144 spots in the tournament were given to past five-time champions and past winners of the Tournament of Champions, College Championship, and Teen Tournament, including those who had won in the current season to that point. The overall winner of the tournament would receive a cash prize of $2 million, with the first runner-up receiving an additional $500,000 and the second an additional $250,000.

Round 1 featured 135 of the 144 contestants competing to advance to Round 2. The remaining nine contestants received byes into Round 2.

Round 2 featured the 18 winners from Round 1 competing to advance to the quarterfinals.

Chuck Forrest, the 1986 Tournament of Champions winner and setter of several show records during his original run as champion, was given one of the nine automatic quarterfinal spots. Three other byes were given to the finalists from the Million Dollar Masters tournament held during the 2002–2003 season, with Bob Verini, Eric Newhouse, and Brad Rutter receiving the honors. Of the five remaining spots, one was given to the first champion to win more than five games (Sean Ryan, six), while another one was given to the champion who recorded the longest winning streak prior to Jennings’ reign (Tom Walsh, seven wins). Of the three remaining byes, they were given out based on total winnings. Frank Spangenberg earned his bye due in part to his being the first contestant to surpass $100,000 in earnings in regular play, while Brian Weikle earned his bye for being the highest-earning champion in regular play prior to the removal of the five-day limit. The last bye was given to Robin Carroll, who became the highest-winning female champion in show history to that date following victories in her Tournament of Champions as well as a subsequent International Tournament of Champions; she held the show’s overall winnings mark as well until Rutter won the Million Dollar Masters in 2002. 

Each match was conducted as a single game affair until the tournament reached the semifinal round. The six remaining contestants competed in two two-game, cumulative score contests to determine who would face Jennings in the finals. The first semifinal was won by 1992 Tournament of Champions finalist Jerome Vered, who defeated Frank Spangenberg and 2000 College Champion Pam Mueller. Brad Rutter won the other semifinal over 1993 champion John Cuthbertson and 2004 champion Chris Miller.

Rutter, Vered, and Jennings then competed in a three-game cumulative score final match for the top prize. Rutter, who had the highest total in all three of the games, finished with $62,000 and won the $2,000,000 prize. Jennings finished second with $34,599 and collected $500,000, while Vered finished third with $20,600, and took home $250,000. All in all, the tournament's contestants won a combined grand total of $5,604,413.

Battle of the Decades 
In 2014, Jeopardy! held a special 5-week tournament billed as the Battle of the Decades to commemorate the Trebek version's 30th season, involving a total of 45 former champions from each of the first 29 completed seasons to that point, and divided into three decades (1984-1993, 1994-2003, and 2004-2013). The winner of the tournament would receive a cash prize of $1 million. 

There were five matches from each decade to decide who advances to the quarterfinals. The first decade was aired February 3-7, 2014, with the second decade airing March 3-7, 2014; and the third aired from March 31-April 4, 2014. 

The quarterfinal matches aired May 5-9, 2014; and the semifinals and finals aired May 12-16, 2014. Ken Jennings, Brad Rutter, and Roger Craig competed in the two-day cumulative score final match for the championship. Rutter won the tournament and took home the $1,000,000 prize. Jennings finished as the first runner-up with $100,000, while Craig was the second runner-up taking home $50,000.

All-Star Games
The Jeopardy! All-Star Games conducted in 2019 feature a team format in which eighteen champions are split up into six groups of three. The six teams are captained by Jennings, Rutter, Colby Burnett, Buzzy Cohen, Austin Rogers and Julia Collins, who each drafted two players from a pool that included Leonard Cooper, Roger Craig, Jennifer Giles, Ben Ingram, Matt Jackson, Alex Jacob, Larissa Kelly, Alan Lin, David Madden, Pam Mueller, Monica Thieu, and Seth Wilson. The draft was streamed live over Facebook on September 22, 2018, with the games themselves airing from February 20 to March 5, 2019. A concurrent fantasy sweepstakes awarded a prize to a home viewer who selected the highest-grossing three individual contestants in the tournament. Team Colby consisted of Burnett, Mueller and Lin, Team Buzzy consisted of Cohen, Jacob, and Giles, Team Julia consisted of Collins, Ingram, and Wilson, Team Ken consisted of Jennings, Jackson, and Thieu; Team Austin consisted of Rogers, Craig, and Cooper, and Team Brad consisted of Rutter, Kelly, and Madden. Each match was played as a relay; one player on each team played a different round of the game, with the winning trio splitting a $1,000,000 prize. Rutter's team won the contest, with Jennings's team finishing second and splitting $300,000; Burnett's team (the wild card entry) came in third, splitting $100,000.

Reunion tournaments
A special one-week Teen Reunion Tournament held in November 1998 invited back 12 former Teen Tournament contestants from that event's first three installments (1987–1989) to compete in a single-elimination tournament. The three highest-scoring winners of the four semifinal matches competed in a one-game final where the champion received $50,000; the second and third-place players received $15,000 and $10,000, respectively. The semifinal winner who did not participate in the finals received $7,500, and the other contestants each received $5,000. The tournament was won by Eric Newhouse, who had previously won the 1989 Teen Tournament.

The Jeopardy! Kids Week Reunion brought back 15 Kids Week alumni from the 1999 and 2000 Kids Week games to compete for a minimum $25,000 each game. The special week of programming was taped on August 12, 2008 and was broadcast from September 15, 2008 to September 19, 2008.

A December 2022 announcement detailed a second teen reunion tournament, billed as the High School Reunion Tournament. 27 contestants, all from the two Season 35 tournaments (2018–19), will participate in a three-week tournament, with a $100,000 prize and the winner competing in the 2023 Tournament of Champions, the first time a Teen Tournament player has been invited to a Tournament of Champions since 2005's Ultimate Tournament of Champions. Mayim Bialik will host the tournament, which will consist of 9 quarterfinal games, 3 semifinal games, and a 2-game total-point final, with no wild cards.

IBM Challenge
A special three day exhibition match, Jeopardy!s IBM Challenge, aired February 14–16, 2011 and featured IBM's Watson computer facing off against Jennings and Rutter in two games, played over three shows. This was the first man-vs.-machine competition in Jeopardy!s history. Watson locked up the first game and the match to win the grand prize of $1 million, which IBM divided between two charities (World Vision International and World Community Grid). Jennings, who won $300,000 for second place, and Rutter, who won the $200,000 third-place prize, both pledged to donate half of their total winnings to their respective charities (Ken's charity was VillageReach, while Brad's was the Lancaster County Community Foundation). The competition brought the show its highest ratings since the Ultimate Tournament of Champions.

International Tournaments
One-week tournaments featuring champions from each of the international versions of Jeopardy! were held in 1996, 1997, and 2001. Each of the countries that aired their own version of the show in those years could nominate a contestant. The format was identical to the semifinals and finals of the Tournament of Champions, save for the inaugural 1996 tournament, which was conducted over four days and featured a one-game final match. The 1996 tournament took place in the normal Jeopardy! studio in California, while the 1997 tournament took place on the set of the Swedish version of the program in Stockholm and the 2001 tournament was held at the Las Vegas Hilton in Nevada. 

In the first two tournaments, the winner was awarded $25,000, while the first and second runners-up received $10,000 and $7,500 respectively, with semifinalists receiving $5,000. For the 2001 tournament, the winner's prize was doubled to $50,000, while the two runners-up received $15,000 and $10,000. 

The first tournament was won by Ulf Jensen from Sweden, while Michael Daunt from Canada won the second and Robin Carroll from the United States won the third. The second tournament actually featured two contestants from the American series, with the United States represented by 1996 three-time champion Gay Mollette; Daunt, who placed third in the Tournament of Champions earlier in the 1996-97 season, was one of many Canadians to compete on Jeopardy! over the years as Canada does not have its own version of the program.

See also 
 List of notable Jeopardy! contestants
 Strategies and skills of Jeopardy! champions

References

External links
Official Jeopardy! website

Jeopardy!